Connor William Dymond (born 12 September 1994) is an English professional footballer who plays for Herne Bay as a midfielder.

Career
Dymond began his career with Crystal Palace, moving on loan to Barnet in March 2014. After captaining the Crystal Palace under–21 team, he was offered a new contract by the club in May 2015. In January 2016 he joined Newport County on a one-month loan. Following his release from the Eagles, Dymond signed for Bromley on 5 August 2016. At the end of the season, Dymond departed the club, having made 34 National League appearances. Dymond joined Welling for the 2017–18 season. He played for Hemel Hempstead Town in August 2018 and then joined Kingstonian later in the month. In December 2018 he moved to Margate. Dymond agreed to stay with Margate for the 2019–20 season but re-joined Welling before the start of the season after a seven-day approach. Dymond joined Cray Valley Paper Mills on 2 August 2020.

Career statistics

References

External links

1994 births
Living people
English footballers
Crystal Palace F.C. players
Barnet F.C. players
Newport County A.F.C. players
Bromley F.C. players
Welling United F.C. players
Hemel Hempstead Town F.C. players
Kingstonian F.C. players
Margate F.C. players
Cray Valley Paper Mills F.C. players
Herne Bay F.C. players
National League (English football) players
English Football League players
Isthmian League players
Association football midfielders